The 105th Infantry Division "Rovigo" was an infantry division of the Royal Italian Army during World War II. The Rovigo was named for the city of Rovigo and  classified as an auto-transportable division, meaning it had some motorized transport, but not enough to move the entire division at once.

History

World War I 
The division's lineage begins with the Brigade "Rovigo" raised on 20 May 1916 with the 227th and 228th infantry regiments. The brigade fought on the Italian front in World War I and was disbanded on 15 November 1917 after it had been overrun during the Battle of Caporetto.

World War II 
The 105th Infantry Division "Rovigo" was activated in Padua on 15 March 1942 and consisted of the 227th and 228th infantry regiments, and the 117th Artillery Regiment. As a division raised during the war the Rovigo did not have its own regimental depots and therefore its regiments were raised by the depots of the auto-transportable 10th Infantry Division "Piave": the 227th Infantry Regiment "Rovigo" was raised in Vicenza on 5 January 1942 by the 57th Infantry Regiment "Piave" and the 228th Infantry Regiment "Rovigo" was raised in Padua on 1 January 1942 by the 58th Infantry Regiment "Piave", while the 117th Artillery Regiment "Rovigo" was raised in Padua by the 20th Artillery Regiment "Piave".

In June 1942 the division moved its units to Southern Piedmont and then in November 1942 to Liguria after XXII Army Corps and its units guarding the Ligurian coast had participated in the occupation of Southern France and remained there as occupation force. In Liguria the Rovigo formed the mobile reserve behind the 201st Coastal Division in the area of Ventimiglia, Sanremo, Imperia, Albenga, and Loano, from where the task of mobile reserve was continued by the 103rd Infantry Division "Piacenza". After the Armistice of Cassibile was announced on 8 September 1943 the division disintegrated and its remnants were dissolved by the invading Germans on 9 September.

Organization 
  105th Infantry Division "Rovigo"
 227th Infantry Regiment "Rovigo"
 Command Company
 3x Fusilier battalions
 Support Weapons Company (65/17 infantry support guns)
 Mortar Company (81mm Mod. 35 mortars)
 228th Infantry Regiment "Rovigo"
 Command Company
 3x Fusilier battalions
 Support Weapons Company (65/17 infantry support guns)
 Mortar Company (81mm Mod. 35 mortars)
 117th Artillery Regiment "Rovigo"
 Command Unit
 I Group (105/28 guns)
 II Group (75/18 Mod. 35 howitzers)
 III Group (75/18 Mod. 35 howitzers)
 2x Anti-aircraft batteries (20/65 Mod. 35 anti-aircraft guns)
 Ammunition and Supply Unit
 CCV Mortar Battalion (81mm Mod. 35 mortars; joined the division in October 1942)
 305th Anti-tank Company (47/32 anti-tank guns)
 80th Engineer Company 
 150th Telegraph and Radio Operators Company
 105th Medical Section
 2x Field hospitals
 1x Surgical unit
 106th Supply Section
 Bakers Section
 152nd Carabinieri Section
 153rd Carabinieri Section
 105th Field Post Office

Commanding officers 
The division's commanding officers were:

 Generale di Brigata Ottorino Battista Dabbeni (15 March 1942 - 14 September 1942)
 Generale di Divisione Pietro Belletti (15 September 1942 - 9 October 1942)
 Generale di Brigata Emilio Rovida (10 October 1942 - 9 September 1943

References 

 

Infantry divisions of Italy in World War II
Military units and formations established in 1942
Military units and formations disestablished in 1943
1942 establishments in Italy